Jaunakaimis ('New village') is a village in Kėdainiai district municipality, in Kaunas County, in central Lithuania. According to the 2011 census, the village has a population of 41 people. The village is located 3 km from Gudžiūnai, by the Dotnuvėlė river and Mantviliškis pond. A small part of the village (Jaunakaimis, Gudžiūnai) belongs to Gudžiūnai Eldership.

Demography

References

 
Villages in Kaunas County
Kėdainiai District Municipality